Sulyok is a surname. Notable people with the surname include:

Béla Sulyok (1904–1977), Hungarian economist
Imre Sulyok (?–1578), Hungarian politician
Mária Sulyok (1908–1987), Hungarian actress 
Vince Sulyok (1932–2009), Hungarian-Norwegian librarian and poet